Mou Waho is an island in Lake Wānaka, New Zealand.
It is around the same size as the nearby Mou Tapu, these two islands being the largest in the lake. The island contains a small lake, called Arethusa Pool.

Buff weka on the island are predators of much of the native wildlife including mountain stone wētā, cave wētā, and Southern Alps geckos. For this reason students of the local Mount Aspiring College built 40 small wooden motels for these animals to safely live in.

See also

 Desert island
 List of islands
 Recursive islands and lakes

References

Uninhabited islands of New Zealand
Islands of Otago
Lake islands of New Zealand